Oliver Gasch (May 4, 1906 – July 8, 1999) was a United States district judge of the United States District Court for the District of Columbia.

Education and career

Born in Washington, D.C., Gasch received an Artium Baccalaureus degree from Princeton University in 1928 and a Bachelor of Laws from George Washington University Law School in 1932. He was in private practice in Washington, D.C. from 1932. He was an assistant corporation counsel for the city of Washington, D.C. from 1937 to 1953. He was general counsel to the Interstate Commission on the Potomac River Basin from 1940 to 1960. He served in the United States Army during World War II, from 1942 to 1946, achieving the rank of lieutenant colonel in the JAG Corps. He was a principal Assistant United States Attorney for the District of Columbia from 1953 to 1956, and was then the United States Attorney for the District of Columbia from 1956 to 1961. He was in private practice in Washington, D.C. from 1961 to 1965.

Federal judicial service

On July 12, 1965, Gasch was nominated by President Lyndon B. Johnson to a seat on the United States District Court for the District of Columbia vacated by Judge Edward Allen Tamm. Gasch was confirmed by the United States Senate on August 11, 1965, and received his commission the same day. He assumed senior status on November 30, 1981. Gasch served in that capacity until his death on July 8, 1999, in Washington, D.C.

Personal

Gasch was married to Sylvia Meyer, a harpist and the first woman member of the National Symphony Orchestra.

See also
Goldwater v. Carter

References

Sources
 
 Interview with Oliver Gasch, District of Columbia Circuit Oral History Project

1906 births
1999 deaths
Judges of the United States District Court for the District of Columbia
United States district court judges appointed by Lyndon B. Johnson
20th-century American judges
United States Army officers
United States Attorneys for the District of Columbia
Assistant United States Attorneys